is a Japanese musician from Osaka who is signed to Sony Music Entertainment Japan. She made her debut as a professional artist in 2011 with the release of her first single "Atashi, Kyō, Shitsuren Shimashita". Her music has been used as theme songs to various anime television series such as Kimi to Boku, Kill la Kill, Akame ga Kill, and Saekano: How to Raise a Boring Girlfriend.

Biography 
Sawai was born in Osaka on September 16, 1993. She wrote several poems for school beginning in her elementary years, but after becoming a fan of the singer Yui in her junior high school years, she decided to become a singer-songwriter. She auditioned with Sony Music Entertainment Japan in 2009, which lead to her being called to Tokyo. She recorded four songs at their studio and was offered a contract, while she was still studying in high school. She made her major debut in 2011 with the release of her first single  on May 11, 2011; the single charted at 110 on the Oricon weekly charts. Due to her work as a singer, she had to transfer to a high school in Tokyo in order to continue her studies. She released her second single  on November 16, 2011; the single's title track was used as the ending theme to the 2011 anime television series Kimi to Boku.

She released her first album Sentimental on June 5, 2013. She then released the single , whose title track was used as the first ending theme to the 2013 anime television series Kill la Kill; the single peaked at 37 on the Oricon weekly charts. She released the single  on August 13, 2014, whose title track is used as the first ending theme to the anime television series Akame ga Kill!. She released the single  on January 28, 2015; the title track is used as the ending theme to the anime television series Saekano: How to Raise a Boring Girlfriend.

On March 25, 2015, she released her second album. Later, on March 2, 2016, she released the single "Wake Me Up"; the title song was used as theme song for Sugoi Japan Award 2016, while the second track of the song "Tsukiakari" (ツキアカリ) is a self-cover of a song she originally wrote for Sora Amamiya second single.

Discography

Studio albums

References

External links 
  
 Official blog 
 

Living people
Musicians from Osaka
1993 births
Anime musicians